The Jammu and Kashmir cricket team is a cricket team based in the Indian union territory of Jammu and Kashmir, run by JKCA. It is in the Elite Group C of the Ranji Trophy. Its main home ground is the Sher-i-Kashmir Stadium in Srinagar, and it also plays at Gandhi Memorial Science College Ground in Jammu.

History
Jammu and Kashmir first took part in the Ranji Trophy in 1959-60. Until recent seasons it had always been one of the weaker teams. Its first victory did not come until the 1982-83 season, when it defeated Services by four wickets. As of mid-November 2020 it had played 301 matches in the competition and won only 32 times, against 199 losses.

In recent seasons Jammu and Kashmir has been more successful. In 2013–14, the team qualified for the knockout stage of the Ranji Trophy after a gap of more than 10 years. Placed in Group C, the state team, which last qualified for the knockout stage in 2001–02 season, notched up four outright wins in the league round to pip Goa by .001 points on net run rate for a berth in the quarterfinals. Later in 2015-16, the team led by Parvez Rasool defeated heavyweights Mumbai at Wankhade Stadium. However, in the following seasons, the team again lost the rhythm. In the ongoing 2018-19 season, they three matches out of nine, finishing at number six in Group C points-table.

Sunil Joshi was the former coach of the team. In 2014, the side tasted early success under him by beating the Ranji giants Mumbai cricket team at Wankhede Stadium in the prelim rounds of Ranji Trophy in 2014–15.

The board appointed Irfan Pathan as mentor cum player of the team ahead of the 2018-19 season. He went to Jammu and Kashmir a few months before the start of domestic season and spent his time with the youngsters there.

Home grounds

 Sher-i-Kashmir Stadium, Srinagar - Hosted 2 ODIs
 Maulana Azad Stadium, Jammu - Hosted one ODI 
 Gandhi Memorial Science College Ground, Jammu
 Jammu & Kashmir International Cricket Stadium, Bajalta - Proposed

Famous players
Ian Dev Singh He is the highest run scorer for J&K in Ranji Trophy and T20s. He has played the highest number of matches for J&K in Ranji Trophy. Recently, he also played domestic cricket in Sri Lanka becoming the only International First class player from JKCA.He has played for India Green, Indian Board President's XI, Jammu & Kashmir, Kandy Customs Cricket Club, North Zone, Rest of India. He scored 145 in his debut match for North Zone in Duleep Trophy becoming the First in the state to score century in Duleep Trophy debut. 

Parvez RasoolHe made his ODI debut for India in 2014 while last played in a T20I against England in 2016. 
Mithun Manhas He is a player in the Indian Premier League represented the Delhi Daredevils in the fourth season of IPL. In the seventh season of the Indian Premier League, he was contracted by the Chennai Super Kings .
 Abid Nabi - once considered one of the fastest bowlers in India.
 Rasikh Salam He recently became the third cricketer from Jammu and Kashmir to get an IPL bid.
Abdul Samad: He became the third J&K cricketer to make debut in IPL.
Umran Malik He plays for Indian national cricket team in international cricket and for Sunrisers Hyderabad in IPL. He is considered as one of the fastest bowler of world cricket at present.

Squad 

 Players with international caps are listed in bold.

Updated as on 24 January 2023

See also 
 Sports in Jammu and Kashmir

References

External links
Jammu and Kashmir at CricketArchive
Cricinfo's Complete History of the Indian Domestic Competitions
Current Jammu & Kashmir Ranji Trophy squad

Indian first-class cricket teams
Cricket in Jammu and Kashmir
Cricket clubs established in 1960
1960 establishments in Jammu and Kashmir